The San Luis Obispo de Tolosa Parish Church (also Saint Louis of Toulouse Parish Church), commonly known as the Lucban Church, is a Roman Catholic parish church located in Lucban, Quezon, Philippines under the supervision of the Roman Catholic Diocese of Lucena. Its titular is Saint Louis of Toulouse.

History

Franciscan priests Father Juán Portocarrero de Plasencia and Father Diego de Oropesa de San José, known as the Apostles of Laguna and Tayabas, established the visita of Lucban in 1578 and started evangelizing the people of the town. It was elevated as a parish in 1595 under Father Miguel de Talavera alongside the construction of its first church made of wood, dedicated to Saint Louis of Toulouse.

The first church was ruined in 1629 and a second church was established on the present site. Construction of the second church, made of stone, masonry, and nipa, proceeded from 1630 to 1640 and the convent was finished in 1650. Church roofing was changed to tiles in 1683 under the supervision of Father Francisco Huerta.

Fire destroyed the building in 1733. That same year, Father Pascual Martinez began construction of a third building, the present one, which was completed in 1738. The rebuilt convent was completed in 1743. On April 4, 1945, the day American soldiers liberated Lucban during World War II, the church was partially damaged by a bomb. It was immediately reconstructed under the supervision of Monsignor Antonio Radovan.

In July 2014 Typhoon Glenda destroyed the roof over the altar, causing flooding inside the church. Under the supervision of the National Historical Commission of the Philippines, the church underwent a full-scale exterior restoration in 2019.

Patron saint

Saint Louis of Toulouse was born in Brignoles, Provence (or in Italy, at Nocera, where he spent a part of his early life), the second son of King Charles II of Naples and Mary of Hungary. Charles became king of Naples in 1285. When Charles was taken prisoner in Italy, during the war with King Peter III of Aragon that followed the Sicilian Vespers, he obtained his own freedom by giving over his three sons as hostages. The boys were taken to Catalonia, where they were placed under the care of Franciscan friars for their education and held for seven years. Impressed by one of the friars in particular, Arnauld de Villeneuve, Louis took up the study of philosophy and theology. Though still held in captivity, Louis was made archbishop of Lyon as soon as he reached his majority. When his older brother died of plague in 1295, Louis also became heir apparent to his father's kingdom; however, when he was freed that same year, Louis went to Rome and gave up all claims to the Angevin inheritance in favor of his brother Robert and announced that instead he would take the Franciscan vows of poverty, chastity, and obedience.

On 5 February 1297, Louis was also consecrated Bishop of Toulouse by Boniface VIII, where his uncle Alphonse had until recently been count, but had died in 1271 leaving no heir. In this ambivalently dynastic and ecclesiastical position, in a territory between Provence and Aquitaine that was essential to Angevin interests, despite the princely standing that had won him this important appointment at the age of about 22, Louis rapidly gained a reputation for serving the poor, feeding the hungry, and ignoring his own needs. After just six months, however, apparently exhausted by his labors, he abandoned the position of Bishop. Shortly thereafter he died at Brignoles of a fever, possibly typhoid, at age 23. Procedures for the canonization of Louis were quickly urged.  His case was promoted by Pope Clement V in 1307, and he was canonized by John XXII on 7 April 1317 with the bull Sol oriens.

Features 
The church follows the baroque design. It has a three-story facade. The second level features semi-circular windows flanked by Corinthian columns and niches containing statues of saints. The church also has an octagonal, three-story belltower standing on a square base.

Administration 
San Luis Obispo Parish Church is within the jurisidiction of the Vicariate of Saint Thomas of the Roman Catholic Diocese of Lucena. Presently, it is administered by Rev. Msgr. Melecio Verastigue, PC and is assisted by Rev. Fr. Roy Cal as parochial vicar.

Lucban Catholic Cemetery

Locally known as Campo Santo, it was built in 1848 during the time of Fray Manuel Sancho, OFM and Capt. Simeon de Ramos. Its construction was paused briefly until Don Casimiro Antonio de Leon decided to complete the project. In 1882, in order to control the spread of cholera and reduce the number of deaths, Don Victor Eleazar oversaw the building of a small chapel (capilla) within the cemetery complex in such a way that will prevent the people from passing-by the parish church to get the priest's final blessing. On a positive note, the impact of cholera on the town wasn't grave as was expected. Because of the building's distinct and eerie character, various horror movie shots were filmed here.

Pahiyas Festival 

A 6:00 AM mass at the church marks the start of the colorful Pahiyas Festival every May 15, at 7:00 AM a procession leaves the church carrying the images of San Isidro Labrador and Beata María de la Cabeza on a route around the town.

Other popular devotions

Santo Entierro De Lucban 
The Santo Entierro De Lucban is regarded by the locals as a miracle-worker. Every Good Friday procession, the image is processed throughout the town in a custom similar to that of Quiapo's Traslacion.  According to Pantaleon Nantes' account, it ended up in a pawnshop in Manila causing many illnesses to the townspeople. Later on, two prominent families — the Lukban-Villaseñor Clan and the present owners, the Rañola clan — have contested the image's original ownership to the extent that they fought all the way to the Corte Suprema (Supreme Court). The high court ruled in favor of the latter. It happened in 1892.

Kalbaryo 
It is a local commemoration of Saint Helena and Bishop Macarius' discovery of Christ's real cross that is held every May 3.

Notes

Bibliography

External links 

Interior photos of church

Roman Catholic churches in Quezon
Baroque architecture in the Philippines
Marked Historical Structures of the Philippines
Spanish Colonial architecture in the Philippines
Churches in the Roman Catholic Diocese of Lucena